"Desde Que No Estás" is a Latin pop song by Colombian recording artist Fonseca. Is the lead single from his fourth studio album Ilusión (2011). It was released on August 22, 2011. The song was nominated in the category Best Tropical Song on the Latin Grammy Awards of 2012.

Track listing

Credits and personnel 
Recording
Recorded at Ozone Studios, Bogotá, Colombia.

Personnel

Songwriting – Juan Fernando Fonseca
Production – Bernardo Ossa
Vocal engineering and recording – Bernardo Ossa
Music recording – Bernardo Ossa and Juan Fernando Fonseca

Assistant vocal recording – Juan Fernando Fonseca
Mixing – Boris Milán

Credits adapted from the liner notes of Ilusión, Sony Music Latin, 10 Music.

Charts

Weekly charts

Year-end charts

Release history

References

Fonseca (singer) songs
2011 singles
Spanish-language songs
2011 songs
Songs written by Fonseca (singer)
Sony Music Latin singles